The 2009 Southern Illinois Salukis football team represented Southern Illinois University as a member of the Missouri Valley Football Conference (MVFC) during  the 2009 NCAA Division I FCS football season. They were led by second-year head coach Dale Lennon and played their home games at McAndrew Stadium. The Salukis finished the season with an 11–2 record overall and an 8–0 mark in conference play, winning the MVFC title. The team received an automatic bid to the FCS playoffs, where they defeated Eastern Illinois in the first round before losing to William & Mary in the quarterfinals. The team was ranked No. 6 in The Sports Network's postseason ranking of FCS teams.

Schedule

References

Southern Illinois
Southern Illinois Salukis football seasons
Missouri Valley Football Conference champion seasons
Southern Illinois Salukis football